Vadim Anatolyevich Pankov  (June 1, 1964, in Moscow) is a Soviet and Russian volleyball coach, head coach of VC Zarechye Odintsovo (since 2007) and Russia women's national volleyball team (since 2018).

He is  awarded  of Medal of the Order For Merit to the Fatherland  II class (1999) and Honored Coach of Russia (2011).

References

External links
 Профиль на сайте Волейбольного центра Московской области
 Вадим Панков:  Карполь – мой учитель. Буду советоваться с ним и дальше

1964 births
Living people
Russian volleyball coaches
Sportspeople from Moscow
Soviet men's volleyball players
Honoured Coaches of Russia
Soviet volleyball coaches
Recipients of the Medal of the Order "For Merit to the Fatherland" II class